Donald "Don" Barker (November 29, 1929 – November 22, 2016) was a Canadian CFL referee. He officiated in more than 500 CFL games including 10 Grey Cup finals from 1958 to 1981.

After retiring he was the CFL Director of Officiating and a supervisor from 1985 through 1998. In 1999, he was inducted as a builder into the Canadian Football Hall of Fame. He died in 2016, a week shy of his 87th birthday.

References

1929 births
2016 deaths
Canadian Football Hall of Fame inductees
Canadian football officials